Ebba Anna Jungmark (born 10 March 1987) is a Swedish high jumper.

She finished fifth at the 2006 World Junior Championships, won the bronze medal at the 2007 European U23 Championships, and competed at the 2007 World Championships without reaching the final. Jungmark won the NCAA Indoor Championship for Washington State University in March 2008 (1.89 m).

Her personal best jump is 1.96 metres, achieved at the 2011 European Athletics Indoor Championships in Paris, France.

Jungmark won the silver medal at the 2012 IAAF World Indoor Championships in Istanbul.

Competition record

References

Swedish female high jumpers
1987 births
Living people
Athletes (track and field) at the 2012 Summer Olympics
Olympic athletes of Sweden